The 1971 Army Cadets football team represented the United States Military Academy in the 1971 NCAA University Division football season. In their sixth year under head coach Tom Cahill, the Cadets compiled a 6–4 record but were outscored by their opponents by a combined total of 206 to 146.  In the annual Army–Navy Game, the Cadets defeated the Midshipmen by a 24 to 23 score. 
 
No Army players were selected as first-team players on the 1971 College Football All-America Team.

Schedule

Personnel

Not listed (missing number/class/position): Bill Barker, Mike Gaines, Bob Jarrell

Game summaries

Navy

References

Army
Army Black Knights football seasons
Army Cadets football